Combat Zone Wrestling's Best of the Best is a professional wrestling tournament and supershow held in the CZW promotion. The annual Best of The Best was originally a junior heavyweight tournament, which in 2005 was repurposed as an all weight tournament.

The first four tournaments saw 12 men first compete in elimination style 3-way matches in the first round before then single elimination matches until a winner was determined. During the 2005 tournament, which was held on May 14, 2005, the winner was determined by all single elimination matches. The original tournament structure returned in 2006, but saw the last four men face off in one match to determine the winner.

Winners

Participants

Results

Best of the Best

CZW's first Best of the Best tournament took place on May 19, 2001, at the Champs Soccer Arena in Sewell, New Jersey.

Best of the Best II

CZW's second Best of the Best tournament took place on June 8, 2002, at the “CZW Arena” (Viking Hall) in Philadelphia, Pennsylvania.

Best of the Best III

CZW's third Best of the Best tournament took place on April 12, 2003, at the “CZW Arena” (Viking Hall) in Philadelphia, Pennsylvania. Due to the show starting late, all the matches had a strict 15 minute time limit.

Best of the Best IV

CZW's fourth Best of the Best tournament took place on July 10, 2004, at the “CZW Arena” (New Alhambra Sports & Entertainment Center) in Philadelphia, Pennsylvania.

Best of the Best V: I Can Feel It in the Air Tonight

CZW's fifth Best of the Best tournament took place on May 14, 2005, at the “CZW Arena” (The Arena) in Philadelphia, Pennsylvania. This was the first Best of the Best tournament to allow heavyweight wrestlers to compete. Also, this Best of the Best tournament did not have the traditional 3-way elimination opening round match. Instead, the final match was a 4-way elimination match.

Best of the Best VI: CZW vs. ROH

CZW's sixth Best of the Best tournament took place on May 13, 2006, at the “CZW Arena” (New Alhambra Arena) in Philadelphia, Pennsylvania. This Best of the Best tournament saw the return of 3-way elimination match for the opening rounds, as well as keeping 4-way elimination match for the final match.

Best of the Best VII

Best of the Best 7 took place on July 14, 2007, at the “CZW Arena” (New Alhambra Arena) in Philadelphia, Pennsylvania.

Best of the Best 8

The eighth Best of the Best took place on May 10, 2008, at the “CZW Arena” (The Arena) in Philadelphia, Pennsylvania, and featured the first female competitor for a Best of the Best tournament in LuFisto.

Best of the Best 9

Best of the Best 9 took place on June 13, 2009, at the “CZW Arena” (The Arena) in Philadelphia, Pennsylvania.

Best of the Best X

The tenth Best of the Best took place on April 9, 2011, at the Asylum Arena in Philadelphia, Pennsylvania.

Best of the Best 11

Was held on April 14, 2012, at the Flyer's Skate Zone in Voorhees, New Jersey.  In addition to the non-tournament matches, Drew Gulak and Danny Havoc signed a contract for a No Ropes Barbwire match that took place on May 12th.

Best of the Best 12

Took place April 13, 2013 at the Flyer's Skate Zone in Voorhees, New Jersey.

Best of the Best XIII

The 13th Best of the Best took place on April 12, 2014, at the Flyer's Skate Zone in Voorhees, New Jersey.

Best of the Best 14

The 14th Best of the Best took place on April 11, 2015, at the Flyer's Skate Zone in Voorhees, New Jersey. During the event, Nick Gage made his return to CZW after spending four years in prison.

Best of the Best 15

The 15th Best of the Best took place on April 9, 2016, at the Flyer's Skate Zone in Voorhees, New Jersey.

Best of the Best 16

The 16th Best of the Best took place on April 1, 2017, in Orlando, Florida

Best of the Best 17

The 17th Best of the Best took place on April 14, 2018, at The Coliseum in Voorhees, New Jersey.

Best of the Best 18

The 18th Best of the Best took place on April 13, 2019, at Colossal Sports Academy in Voorhees, New Jersey.

References

External links
Tournament results
Online World of Wrestling - CZW Results Archive

Combat Zone Wrestling shows
Professional wrestling tournaments
Recurring events established in 2001